Sujatha Puthra (Legitimate Son) is a 2016 Sri Lankan Sinhala-language drama film written and directed by Sripali Hettiarachchi and produced by director himself with Amila Rashendra for AIBA Films. The film stars two child artists Pramuditha Udaya Kumara and Harshi Rasanga in the lead roles along with popular artists Dilhani Ekanayake, Mihira Sirithilaka and Nayana Kumari in supportive roles. Cinemaography, editing and music composed by Sajeewa Sankalpa. It is the 1258th Sri Lankan film in the Sinhala cinema.

Plot

Sumudu is an eight-years-old boy. He is a wise boy and also clever to learning. A few months after the baby is born, he loses his father's love forever. Sumudu's mother is young. Still beautiful in beauty too. She makes a living from the meager wages she earns. They live in a rented house. Homeowner seeks Sumudhu's mother But when the landlord finds out that she is not able to pay the money, he makes an improper proposal to Sumudhu's mother.

He tells her not to rent if she agrees. Sumudu's mother lived a life of self-respect till now. Despite the harassment and harassment of the landlord, she vehemently rejected the proposal. For Sumudhu feels this. The mother also learns that she will have to leave the house shortly. Sumudhu's next step is to own a house somehow.

Sumudu decides to meet the Minister in charge of the province. But he did not know of a possible course of action. In the end, attempts to meet the Minister through the senior monks of the temple were unsuccessful. The monks who soon offered to help Sumudhu also died, making Sumudhu even more helpless. Somehow he finds the minister's phone number and speaks to the minister across the smooth length.

Sumudu also comes to a function he attends and asks the Minister for a house. Will Sumudhu's intention be fulfilled in the end? What will be the fate of Sumudu and his mother? Will Sumudhu's family fall prey to the homeowner?

Cast
 Pramuditha Udaya Kumara as Sumudu
 Harshi Rasanga as Dilini 		
 Dilhani Ekanayake as Mrs. Hettiarachchi		 
 Nayana Kumari as Sumudu's mother		 
 Kumara Thirimadura as Mudalali		
 Ravindra Randeniya as Minister		
 Mihira Sirithilaka as Dayasena		
 Nanda Wickrama		
 Lakshman Amarasekara		
 Nihal Premachandra		
 Diana Hettiarachchi		
 Upul Weerasinghe

References

External links
 
 Sujatha Puthra on YouTube

2010s Sinhala-language films
2016 films